Joan Margaret Kingston (born January 8, 1955) is a nurse, teacher and former political figure in New Brunswick, Canada. She represented New Maryland in the Legislative Assembly of New Brunswick as a Liberal member from 1995 to 1999.

She was born in Sussex, New Brunswick, and educated at the University of New Brunswick. She was president of the Nurses Association of New Brunswick and an instructor at the University of New Brunswick. Kingston served in the province's Executive Council as Minister of the Environment and Minister of Labour. She was defeated in the 1999 general election. Kingston is currently employed in the Office of the Premier of New Brunswick.

References

External links
 List of Women MLAs, New Brunswick Legislative Library

1955 births
Living people
New Brunswick Liberal Association MLAs
Members of the Executive Council of New Brunswick
Women MLAs in New Brunswick
Women government ministers of Canada